Events in the year 1877 in Iceland.

Incumbents 

 Monarch: Christian IX
 Minister for Iceland: Johannes Nellemann

Births 

 Sigfús Einarsson, Icelandic composer
 3 March − Jón Þorláksson, prime minister of Iceland.

References 

 
1870s in Iceland
Years of the 19th century in Iceland
Iceland
Iceland